The MOS Technology 65xx series is a family of 8-bit microprocessors from MOS Technology, based on the Motorola 6800 (introduced ca. 1975). The most prolific 65xx part was the 6502 was used in various 1980s home computers.

The 6501 and 6502 have 40-pin DIP packages; the 6503, 6504, 6505, and 6507 are 28-pin DIP versions, for reduced chip and circuit board cost. In all of the 28-pin versions, the pin count is reduced by leaving off some of the high-order address pins and various combinations of function pins, making those functions unavailable.

Typically, the 12 pins omitted are the three not connected (NC) pins, one of the two Vss pins, one of the clock pins, the SYNC pin, the set overflow (SO) pin, either the maskable interrupt or the non-maskable interrupt (NMI), and the four most-significant address lines (A12–A15) are the 12 pins omitted to reduce the pin count from 40 to 28.  The omission of four address pins reduces the external addressability to 4 KB (from the 64 KB of the 6502), though the internal PC register and all effective address calculations remain 16-bit.

The 6507 omits both interrupt pins in order to include address line A12, providing 8 KB of external addressability but no interrupt capability.  The 6507 was used in the popular Atari 2600 video game console, the design of which divides the 8 KB memory space in half, allocating the lower half to the console's internal RAM and peripherals, and the upper half to the Game Cartridge, so Atari 2600 cartridges have a 4 KB address limit (and the same capacity limit unless the cartridge contains bank switching circuitry).

One popular 6502-based computer, the Commodore 64, used a modified 6502 CPU, the 6510. Unlike the 6503–6505 and 6507, the 6510 is a 40-pin chip that adds internal hardware: an 8-bit parallel I/O port mapped to addresses 0000 and 0001.  The 6508 is another chip that, like the 6510, adds internal hardware: 256 bytes of SRAM and the same 8-bit I/O port featured by the 6510.  Though these chips do not have reduced pin counts compared to the 6502, they need 8 new pins for the added parallel I/O port.  In this case, no address lines are among the 8 removed pins.

References

External links
MOS 6508 datasheet (GIF format, zipped)

65xx microprocessors